Navia pauciflora is a plant species in the genus Navia. This species is endemic to Venezuela.
The specific epithet pauciflora is Latin for 'few-flowered'.

References

pauciflora
Flora of Venezuela